Paolo Zacchia il Vecchio,  Zacchia the elder, or Zacchia di Antonio da Vezzano (1490-1561) was an Italian painter of the Renaissance period. He was born in Vezzano Ligure and active in Lucca. He probably trained Florence, his works show influences of Domenico Ghirlandaio and Fra Bartolomeo. His son Lorenzo di Ferro Zacchia or Zacchia il Giovane was also a painter and engraver, active in Lucca.

References

External links
    
Italian Paintings: Florentine School, a collection catalog containing information about the artist and their works (see pages: 207–208)

Painters from Lucca
16th-century Italian painters
Italian male painters
Renaissance painters
1561 deaths
1490 births